A virtual organization is a temporary or permanent collection of geographically dispersed individuals, groups, organizational units, or entire organizations that depend on electronic linking in order to complete the production process (working definition). Virtual organizations do not represent a firm’s attribute but can be considered as a different organizational form and carries out the objectives of cyber diplomacy.

Unfortunately, it is quite hard to find a precise and fixed definition of fundamental notions such as virtual organization or virtual company. The term virtual organization ensued from the phrase "virtual reality", whose purpose is to look like reality by using electronic sounds and images. The term virtual organization implies the novel and innovative relationships between organizations and individuals. Technology and  globalization both support this particular type of organization.

Virtual can be defined as "not physically existing as such but made by software to appear to do so", in other words "unreal but looking real". This definition precisely outlines the leading principle of this unconventional organization, which holds the form of a real (conventional) corporation from the outside but does not actually exist physically and implicates an entirely digital process relying on independents web associates. Thus, virtual organizations are centred on technology and position physical presence in the background.  Virtual organizations possess limited physical resources as value is added through (mobile) knowledge rather than (immovable) equipment.

Virtual organizations necessitate associations, federations, relations, agreements and alliance relationships  as they essentially are partnership webs of disseminated organizational entities or self-governing corporations.

Apparition and evolution

1980s 

The emergence of outsourcing in the 80s unquestionably played a significant role as its aim is to eradicate unproductive internal services and transfers the difficulty outside of the organization. Outsourcing necessarily implies partnerships as companies resort to other establishments. Thus, this method highlighted the necessity of alliances and networking in a business and provoked a great interest for new disciplines. Indeed, this process has dramatically changed the way organizations consider partners and has raised their awareness concerning the benefits smart alliances can offer. Though, until the early 1980s, this extremely bureaucratic organization arrangement (involving challenging, complex and slower decision-making) was considered adequate to manage a vast number of employees.

1990s 

The terms virtual organization, virtual enterprise or virtual corporation were first utilized in the early 1990s as demonstrate the work of Jan Hopland, Roger N. Nagel, William H. Davidow and Malone. The table below allows us to understand more specifically their faintly distinctive theories:

Today 

As mentioned before, there is not yet a universal definition of the term virtual organization. Even though this concept started to evolve a long time ago it is still progressing nowadays. We can observe below the innovative virtual organization's model focusing on quickly and efficiently creating first-class products (using each partner core competence).

Technology required 

Virtual organizations are supported by primary technologies such as the Internet and the World Wide Web, EDI, telecommunications, e-mails, groupware, and video conferencing.

Knowledge management technologies 
Knowledge management technologies assisting virtual organizations comprise:

 Collaborative technologies
 Extensible markup language (XML)
 Intranets and extranets
 Personal devices
 Wireless technologies
 Virtual reality (VR)
 Portals

EDI 

EDI can constitute a useful tool for virtual organizations as it transfers information (in the adequate form which a computer can utilize straightforwardly) from a computer to another and does not necessitate the intervention of any individual. EDI could be a benefit to virtual organizations in numerous ways as the exchange of information between associates is facilitated and more efficient than with non-electronic transfer: better inventory management and shipping performance, amount of time saved and faults escaped by the fact that data requisite to be entered only once, as well as a rise of the speed and accuracy of processes. However, using EDI is not the optimal choice to make for assisting communication within a virtual organization, as the flexibility required for quick reactions is lacking in this system.

Groupware 

Virtual organizations can be supported by groupware systems as it delivers a shared core of information to partners and a platform to collaborate regardless of the associates’ physical position. This way, groupware systems can assist associates track the rate of progress in work being done in a way that they can cooperate on the project without being concerned about geographical barriers. However, in a similar way as EDI, groupware is not the ideal decision to make for assisting communication within a virtual organization as it would not empower the organization to rapidly form an alliance to respond to a market opportunity, even though it offers more flexibility than EDI.

World Wide Web (WWW) 

Many virtual firms have chosen the internet-based WWW in order to support organizational communication, as it constitutes a practical alternative to the EDI and groupware’s inflexibility. Even though helping virtual organizations’ associates to communicate was not the initial purpose of the WWW, it is still favourably relevant to this category of organizations. The web permits all co-workers (even the isolated ones) to share their thoughts, opinions and every part of any mutual mission as it was shaped to be a sort of data gathering of individuals’ knowledge.

Benefits

To the organization 

 Competitive advantage
 As a way of to conduct supply chain integration or bridge the merger and acquisition processes between two companies.[online] 
 A pool of abilities and knowledge
 Flexibility, dynamism and better responsiveness : virtual organizations, also called "boundaryless organization", do not imply time or geographical obstacles
 Less investments costs initially
 Productivity: the implementation of virtual organization implies a 30 to 50% rise of productivity
 Less costs, more profits: virtual organization are saving a huge amount of money as they are no real-estate investments necessary, the labor cost is inferior and the number of errors is poorer

To the employees 

 More independence: individuals can work when they need to and decide in which ways 
 Amount of stress reduced: no workplace pressure and consequently an improved personal and family life
 Less money spent: diminution of gas consumption or money spent on public transports

To the society 

 An environmental benefit: less pollution
 Expansion of the workplace area: possibility to work efficiently in the rural areas

Issues and challenges encountered 

Despite the advantages provided, it can be quite challenging to those familiar to conventional work group to lead as a virtual organization. Thus, large risks are conveyed with the challenge of working virtually as this new organizational structure implies several issues.  Some people wrongly think that the challenges only come from the technology management but we should not forget the importance of humans.  
Clearly information technology offers an efficient and largely beneficial platform but we should not neglect the necessity, especially in a virtual organization, of the individuals’ skills and manner to collaborate.

Communication 

Communication is a crucial factor in a virtual organization as it is responsible of its efficiency and even to its survival. Virtual organizations imply various autonomous and international workers, which also involve challenges such as different time zones and language barriers. The collaboration between associates might also get quite complicated as this type of organization denotes only a slight amount of face-to-face interaction. Thus, a lack of multiple communication approaches can be observed in virtual organizations.

Cultural 

Culture constitutes an essential element in any organization of any type. Yet, virtual organizations have to be even more vigilant about this notion as they imply a shared leadership between the team, which is composed of self-reliant workers from all around the world. Virtual organizations must find a way to overcome cultural differences, which involve dissimilar approaches of working (such as time and deadlines) and living (punctuality for instance), in other words, distinctive philosophies. Thus, virtual organization must exegete respect for differences among the team.

Interpersonal 

Managing virtually successfully requires a valuable communication and cooperation among the team. Perceptions between partners might be quite dissimilar and could lead to conflicts concerning the management of the virtual organization. Thus, it is more than necessary that associates build a solid relationship despite the distance obstacle  Trust is also a crucial matter as a shared leadership among co-workers consequently implies the loss of control on certain functions entrusted to other associates.

Technological 

Virtual organizations are completely dependent to technology as they are entirely internet-based. It is more than necessary for the individuals involved in a partnership to possess similar technological tools from its associates. Compatibility matters resulting from the hardware and software such as the operating system as well as certain computer’s software might disturb the efficiency of the virtual organization. For instance, the occurrence of incompatibility issues (difficulty in integrating information generated with dissimilar tools) concerning the hardware or software, would dramatically affect virtual organizations’ process and performance as they depend on these tools. Institute, uphold and spread a definite common knowledge between partners is one of the ultimate issue to virtual organizations’ management. Security and data protection also constitute a significant challenge as all the information regarding virtual organizations are transmitted and gathered digitally. A continuous control and evaluation of the technology utilized should be done by virtual organizations in order to prevent being outdated and losing opportunities.

Economical 

Virtual organization involves considerable costs. Between the setup and equipment costs and the maintenance costs, the bill can become quite steep quickly. It also constitutes a challenge to measure, evaluate and track the work done within the different departments of the virtual infrastructure. This might lead to partners missing deadlines, the necessity to rework and, thus, a loss of efficiency and profit.

Examples of virtual organizations

Private sector 

 Hollywood 
 British Telecom
 Reuters Holdings
 Aventis
 Center for Culture & Global Studies

Public sector 

  United States Department of Agriculture (USDA) National Plant Data Center
 United States Department of Energy (The Office of Science Integrated Support Center) 
 Emics and OphSmart

See also 
 VOICED - Virtual Organization for Innovative Conceptual Engineering Design

References

Business models
Types of organization